Târgu Lăpuș (Hungarian: Magyarlápos) is a town in Maramureș County, northern Transylvania, Romania. It administers thirteen villages: Boiereni (Boérfalva), Borcut (Borkút), Cufoaia (Kohópatak), Dămăcușeni (Domokos), Dobricu Lăpușului (Láposdebrek), Dumbrava (Kisdebrecen), Fântânele (until 1960 Poiana Porcului; Lápospataka), Groape (Groppa), Inău (Ünőmező), Răzoare (Macskamező), Rogoz (Rogoz), Rohia (Rohi), and Stoiceni (Sztojkafalva).

Geography
The town is situated at the northwestern edge of the Transylvanian Plateau, at the foot of the Lăpuș Mountains. It lies on the banks of the river Lăpuș and of its tributary, the river Suciu, which flows into the Lăpuș in Dămăcușeni village.

Târgu Lăpuș is located in the southern part of Maramureș County, on the border with Cluj and Sălaj counties. It is the center of the  ethnographic region. The town is crossed by national road , which runs from the county seat, Baia Mare,  to the northwest, to Cășeiu commune (near Dej),  to the south.

Sights
The Church of the Holy Archangels in Rogoz village is one of eight Wooden Churches of Maramureș listed by UNESCO as a World Heritage Site. Among the town's historic buildings are also the Roman Catholic church (1752), the Calvinist church (1839), the Orthodox church (1906–1912), the old school (1858), and the old town hall, now a dispensary (19th century). Rohia Monastery is also located within the town limits.

The Union Monument is an obelisk located behind the Reformed Church. The monument commemorates the 21 inhabitants of Târgu Lăpuș who were massacred by Hungarian troops in December 1918 while celebrating the Union of Transylvania with Romania.

Demographics
In 2011, Târgu Lăpuș had a population of 11,744. Of these, 86.5% were Romanians, 12.4% Hungarians, and 1% Roma. 74.5% belonged to the Romanian Orthodox Church, 10.1% to the Reformed Church, 7.3% were Pentecostal, 4% Greek-Catholic, and 2.7% Roman Catholic.

Natives
  (1745–1816), cleric and mineralogist
 Grigore Leșe (b. 1954), musician
 Remus Ludu (1914–1982), gymnast
  (b. 1955), politician
 Onișor Nicorec (b. 1986), footballer
 Vasile Oană (b. 1972), footballer

Economy
Răzoare is an old mining village, with iron ore and manganese
(as well as muscovite, bentonite, and kaolinite) being exploited here since 1770. Other minerals found in the area are magnetite, garnet, dannemorite, beryl, tourmaline,  leucophoenicite, ribbeite, sodalite, and alleghanyite. The Răzoare mine opened in 1988; its closure in 2006 was a heavy blow to the local economy and led to a drop in the town's population.

Education
The town has two high schools: the Petru Rareș Theoretical High School and the Grigore C. Moisil Technological College.

References

External links
 

 
Towns in Romania
Populated places in Maramureș County
Localities in Transylvania